"Save the Country" is a song written by Laura Nyro, first released by her as a single in 1968. Nyro released another version of the song on her 1969 album New York Tendaberry.

Background
Nyro was inspired to write the song after the June 5, 1968 assassination of Robert Kennedy.

5th Dimension recording
The most successful version was performed by The 5th Dimension. It reached #10 on the U.S. adult contemporary chart, #24 in Canada, #27 on the Billboard Hot 100, and #79 in Australia in 1970. It was featured on their 1970 album Portrait. The song was produced by Bones Howe and arranged by Bill Holman, Bob Alcivar, and Howe.

Other versions
 Julie Driscoll with Brian Auger and the Trinity released a version of the song on their 1969 album Streetnoise.
 Canadian band The Sugar Shoppe, which included actor and singer Victor Garber, released a version of the song in 1969.
 Paul Revere & The Raiders (under the shortened name Raiders) made the song the opening track of their 1970 album Collage.
 Thelma Houston released a version of the song in 1970 that reached #73 in Canada and #74 on the Billboard Hot 100.
 Rosanne Cash released a version of the song on the 1997 Nyro tribute album Time and Love: The Music of Laura Nyro.
 Roberta Flack performed her version of the song in a live broadcast from KCET in the 1970s.
 Nyro's version was sampled by Kanye West on his song "The Glory" off his third studio album Graduation.

References

1969 songs
1970 singles
Soul songs
Songs written by Laura Nyro
Laura Nyro songs
The 5th Dimension songs
Rosanne Cash songs
Bell Records singles
Dunhill Records singles
Song recordings produced by Bones Howe
Gospel songs